Heera Aur Pathar is a 1964 Pakistani Urdu language black-and-white film. 

It is the first film of Waheed Murad as a lead actor who also produced it. The film was released on 11 December 1964. Murad introduced film director Pervez Malik for the first time in the Pakistani cinema world. Also he had introduced film editor, M. Aqeel Khan, who had later received the Nigar award for this movie for his work. It was a hit film of 1964.

Cast and crew

 Waheed Murad
 Zeba
 Nirala
 Ibrahim Nafees
 Kamal Irani

Crew
 Music: Sohail Rana
 Editing: M. Aqeel Khan
 Camera: Nazir Hussain
 Assistant Camera: Badar Munir

Music
The music of the film was composed by Sohail Rana. Sohail earned plaudits from his fans for the composition of Mujhay tum say mohabbat hai.... Although, he did not earn a Nigar Award for this film. The songs were written by Masroor Anwar and Mauj Lakhnavi. Playback singers are: Khursheed Nurali (Sheerazi) Ahmed Rushdi, Najma Niazi, Khursheed Begum, Saleem Shahzad, Mala, Wasim Farooqui and Talat Siddiqui.

Songography
Mujhay tum se mohabbat hai... by Ahmed Rushdi and Najma Niazi
Gori simti jaye sharam se... by Ahmed Rushdi
Aaj mujhe kya hua... by Najma Niazi
Rahey himmat jawan apni... by  Khursheed Nurali (Sheerazi) and Saleem Shehzad
Ja ja rey chanda... by Mala
Mujhay ek larki se pyar ho gaya... by Saleem Shahzad and Talat Siddiqui
Aao manaen picnic... by Waseem Farooqui and Khursheed Begum

Awards
Film Heera Aur Pathar won two Nigar awards for the year 1964: 
Waheed Murad won Nigar Award in the Best Actor category 
 M. Aqeel Khan won Nigar Award in the Best Film Editor category

References

Pakistani drama films
Pakistani black-and-white films
Films scored by Sohail Rana
1960s Urdu-language films
1964 films
Nigar Award winners
Urdu-language Pakistani films